George Bancroft Abbe (January 28, 1911 – March 15, 1989)  was an American poet and novelist.

Life
He was graduated from the University of New Hampshire in 1933 and from the University of Iowa in 1938.

He taught at Mount Holyoke College, Yale University, University of Connecticut, Wayne State University, Columbia University, University of Maine, Springfield College, Central Connecticut State College, Russell Sage College, State University of New York at Plattsburgh.

His work appeared in Poetry Magazine,  He had tea with Sylvia Plath.

A novel manuscript is at University of Iowa.
He corresponded with Nicholas Joost, Judith Moffett, and Stephen Vincent Benét, and wrote a foreword to his book Stephen Vincent Benét on writing.

Awards
 1956/1957 Shelley Memorial Award
 Two grants from State University of New York Research Awards Foundation

Works

Poetry

Novels
 
 Dreamer's Clay. New York: Holt, 1940
 
 The Winter House: New York: Doubleday, 1957
 One More Puritan: Chicago, Windfall, 1963
 The Non-Conformist. Boston: Branden, 1966
 The Funeral: New York: Horizon, 1967
 Yonderville. Boston: Branden, 1969

Non-Fiction

 The Larks. Bauhan, 1974
 Abbe and Benet, 1976
 The Pigeon Lover. Donning, 1981

Editor
 Hill Wind, YMCA, 1935
 Stephen Vincent Benet on Writing. Stephen Greene, 1964
  Poetry in the Round: A Poetry Workshop, Smithsonian Folkways, George Abbe, 1961

References

1911 births
1989 deaths
Poets from Connecticut
University of New Hampshire alumni
University of Iowa alumni
Mount Holyoke College faculty
Yale University faculty
University of Connecticut faculty
Wayne State University faculty
Columbia University faculty
Springfield College (Massachusetts) faculty
Russell Sage College faculty
State University of New York at Plattsburgh faculty
University of Maine faculty
Central Connecticut State University faculty
20th-century American poets
People from Somers, Connecticut